Ramshekhar Prasad Singh (born 17 January 1924) is an Indian politician. He was elected to the Lok Sabha, the lower house of the Parliament of India from Chapra,  Bihar as a member of the Indian National Congress.He was defeated by Lalu Prasad Yadav in 1977.

References

External links
  Official biographical sketch on the Parliament of India website

1924 births
Possibly living people
Indian National Congress politicians
Lok Sabha members from Bihar
India MPs 1962–1967
India MPs 1967–1970
India MPs 1971–1977